Tivydale, Texas is an unincorporated farming and ranching community located in Gillespie County, located  west of Fredericksburg, and was originally known as Bunkesville and Pumpkinville.

Establishment
On December 15, 1847, a petition was submitted to create Gillespie County. In 1848, the legislature formed Gillespie County from Bexar and Travis counties. While the signers were overwhelmingly German immigrants, names also on the petition were Castillo, Pena, Munos,  and a handful of non-German Anglo names.

Tivydale is named for Joseph Albert Tivy. Born in Canada, and later served as a Texas Ranger, Tivy was an adventurer and entrepreneur.  He joined the California Gold Rush, fought in the Civil War, served in legislatures both in California and in Texas, and later became mayor of Kerrville.

Tivy had bought several thousand acres of land in 1847 and 1848 in Gillespie County. Between 1877 and 1885, he sold land in the Pedernales River valley. Capt. Joseph Tivy died in 1892 and is buried on Tivy Mountain on the edge of Kerrville with his wife, one sister and his wife's cat.

The German-music Bunkesville Band was a popular area entertainment.

Schützenfest

Tivydale has an active schützenbund (shooting club) and participates in the annual Gillespie County Bundes Schützenfest.  The event includes crowning of one or more Schützenkönigs (shooting kings), a parade and a Saengerfest.

References

Additional sourcing

Unincorporated communities in Gillespie County, Texas
Unincorporated communities in Texas
German-American history
German-American culture in Texas